Pachymetoides is a monotypic moth genus in the family Lasiocampidae described by Strand in 1912. Its single species, Pachymetoides stigmatica, described by the same author in the same year, is found in Gabon and Nigeria.

References

Lasiocampidae
Monotypic moth genera